Saint-Quentin-du-Dropt (literally Saint-Quentin of the Dropt; Languedocien: Sent Quentin de Dròt) is a commune in the Lot-et-Garonne department in south-western France.

See also
Communes of the Lot-et-Garonne department

References

Saintquentindudropt